Red Bluff is an unincorporated community, in Marlboro County, South Carolina, United States. Red Bluff Lake, also known as Red Bluff Pond, is in the area and is used for fishing.

John L. McLaurin (1860-1934), lawyer and politician, was born in Red Bluff, in Marlboro County.

Notes

Unincorporated communities in Marlboro County, South Carolina
Unincorporated communities in South Carolina